National Identity Management Commission (NIMC) is a statutory Nigerian organization that operates the country's national identity management systems. It was established by the NIMC Act No. 23 of 2007 to create, operate and manage Nigeria's national identity card database, integrate the existing identity database in government institutions, register individuals and legal residents, assign a unique national identification number and introduce general multi-purpose cards.

History
A national identity card system was initially conceived in 1977 but the project did not see the light of the day. In 2003, a new scheme managed by the Directorate of National Civic Registration (DNCR) was initiated and about 54 million Nigerians were registered, however, the scheme failed to meet official expectations and was also hampered by allegations of corruption and embezzlement of funds. The National Identity Management Commission came into effect in 2010 and an initial budget of about 30 billion naira was appropriated in the 2011 federal budget. The commission subsequently entered into an agreement with the National Database & Registration Authority of Pakistan to develop computerized national identity cards for Nigerians. The commission also partnered with two consortiums, the first led by Chams Nigeria and the second, OneSecureCard consortium composed of Interswitch, SecureID, and Iris Technologies to provide data capture services.

National identification number
The national identification number is a part of Nigeria's National Identity Management System, the other part is the General Multi-Purpose Card. The number stores an individual's unique data into the database. It is part of a measure to create a national identity database and to prevent both double identity and identity fraud.

Identity card
The organization began enrollment exercise in September 2010 and started the issuance of a multipurpose card in 2013. The identity card issued in 2013 can be obtained by Nigerians aged sixteen or have lived in the country for two or more years at point of enrollment providing an identification document with a photograph such as a driver's license or an international passport. The ID card contains a National Identity Number, two photographs of the card holder, and a chip containing the biometric information of the holder. The commission also collaborated with MasterCard to add a prepaid element to the card and can be used as an ATM card in MasterCard certified ATMs.

References

External links
Official website of the National Identity Management Commission

Government agencies of Nigeria
2007 establishments in Nigeria
Government agencies established in 2007
Nigerian identity
Nigeria